Monsampietro Morico is a comune (municipality) in the Province of Fermo in the Italian region Marche, located about  south of Ancona, about  north of Ascoli Piceno and  of Fermo. It was founded in 1061 as a castle (rebuilt in the 15th century) under a Norman count from Apulia. Later it was part of the de Varano seigniory and, from 1415 to 1416, of Carlo Malatesta's lands. It is also home to a 13th-century Romanesque church, dedicated to St. Paul.

Monsampietro Morico borders the following municipalities: Belmonte Piceno, Monte Rinaldo, Monteleone di Fermo, Montelparo, Montottone.

References

Cities and towns in the Marche